Jessica Sorensen is an American novelist. Her novel The Secret of Ella and Micha was featured in the USA Today Bestseller List  and was responsible for creating a new wave of New-adult fiction. Sorensen also wrote the fantasy series The Fallen Star and Darkness Falls. The books in her The Coincidence series are also bestsellers.

Writings

The Coincidence series
The Coincidence of Callie & Kayden (2012)
The Redemption of Callie and Kayden (2013)
The Destiny of Violet and Luke (2014)
The Probability of Violet and Luke (2014)
The Certainty of Violet and Luke (2014)
The Resolution of Callie and Kayden (2014)
Seth and Greyson (2015)

The Secret series
The Prelude of Ella and Micha (2014)
The Secret of Ella and Micha (2012)
The Forever of Ella and Micha (2013)
The Temptation of Lila and Ethan (2013)
The Ever After of Ella and Micha (2013)
Lila and Ethan: Forever and Always (2013)
Ella and Micha: Infinitely & Always (2014)

Nova series
Breaking Nova (2013)
Saving Quinton (2014)
Delilah: The Making of Red (2014)
Nova and Quinton: No Regrets (2014)
Tristan: Finding Hope (2014)
Wreck Me (2014)
Ruin Me (2015)

Unraveling You series
Unraveling You (2014)
Raveling You (2015)
Awakening You (2015)
Inspiring You (2015)

Unbeautiful series
Unbeautiful (2014)
Untamed (2014)

Darkness Falls
Darkness Falls (2012)
Darkness Breaks (2012)
Darkness Fades (Sept 2013)

Fallen Star
The Fallen Star (2011)
The Underworld (2011)
The Vision (2011)
The Promise (2012)
The Lost Soul (2012)
The Evanescence (2012)

Shattered Promises
Shattered Promises (2013)
Fractured Souls (2013)
Unbroken (2013)
Broken Visions (2014)
Scattered Ashes (2015)

Death Collectors
Ember (2013)
Cinder (2013)
Spark (2015)

Death Collectors X
Ember X (2013)
Cinder X (2013)
Spark X (2015)

Standalones
The Forgotten Girl (2014)

References

Living people
American women novelists
21st-century American novelists
21st-century American women writers
Year of birth missing (living people)